James Kamp (December 5, 1907 – July 4, 1953) was an American football offensive lineman in the National Football League for the Boston Redskins and Staten Island Stapletons.  He played college football at Oklahoma City University.

References

1907 births
1953 deaths
Oklahoma City Chiefs football players
Players of American football from Oklahoma
People from El Reno, Oklahoma
American football offensive linemen
Staten Island Stapletons players
Boston Redskins players